"Keep It Between the Lines" is a song written by Russell Smith and Kathy Louvin, and recorded by American country music singer Ricky Van Shelton. It was released in July 1991 as the second single from his fourth studio album Backroads, and was the tenth and final No. 1 single of his career.

Music video
The music video was directed and produced by Deaton Flanigen and premiered in mid-1991.

Chart positions

Year-end charts

References

1991 singles
Ricky Van Shelton songs
Music videos directed by Deaton-Flanigen Productions
Songs written by Russell Smith (singer)
Song recordings produced by Steve Buckingham (record producer)
Columbia Nashville Records singles
1991 songs